WHME may refer to:

 WHME (FM), a radio station (103.1 FM) licensed to South Bend, Indiana, United States
 WHME-TV, a television station (channel 36, virtual 46) licensed to South Bend, Indiana, United States